The 2018 Metro Manila Film Festival (MMFF) is the 44th edition of the annual Metro Manila Film Festival held in Metro Manila and throughout the Philippines. It is organized by the Metropolitan Manila Development Authority (MMDA). During the festival, no foreign films are shown in Philippine theaters (except IMAX and 4D theaters).

Entries

Feature films
The Metro Manila Film Festival (MMFF) Executive Committee announced four of the eight official entries in June 2018. The first four films were selected based from the script submission. On October 9, the last four films were announced by the MMFF Selection Committee headed by National Artist for Literature, Bienvenido Lumbera. They are all finished films.

Short films
A short film competition for students was organized as part of the film festival. A total of 123 entries were submitted with eight of them selected as finalists. The eight selected short films were screened alongside the official eight full-length films during the whole official run of the film festival.
{| class="wikitable" style="margin: 1em 1em 1em 0; background: #f9f9f9; border: 1px #aaa solid; border-collapse: collapse; font-size: 90%;"
|- 
! width=20%|Title !!width=5%| Director !!width=15%| School
|-
|Balita()||Harold Joshua Singzon||Centro Escolar University
|-
|Binibini 14. Beverly Lagdameo()||Neil Adrien Reyes||De La Salle – College of St. Benilde
|-
|Dalawampung Pisong Pag-asa()||Pauleen Valdez||St. Dominic College of Asia
|-
|Kasilyas()||Leslie Ann Ramirez||Bulacan State University
|-
|Padyak()||Venice Awitin||Northern Mindanao Colleges
|-
|Paraiso()||Carlo Lopez||University of the Philippines Diliman
|-
|Tahanan()|||Demetrio Celestino III||Catanduanes State University
|-
|Sasagot Ka Pa?()||Ronald Van Angelo Dulatre||De La Salle – College of St. Benilde
|}

Parade of Stars

Parañaque was selected as the host city of the launch of the metropolis-wide film festival in March 2018 by the MMFF Executive Committee. The hosting coincides with the 20th anniversary of Parañaque's conversion into a city.

The parade began near Shopwise Santana Grove in Sucat, where an estimated crowd of 300,000 waited for the start of the event, and ended on Bradco Avenue. The parade route also included Dr. A. Santos Avenue, V. Medina Avenue, Quirino Avenue, NAIA Road, and Macapagal Boulevard. The Parañaque Traffic and Parking Management Office closed a significant portion of Dr. A. Santos Avenue starting from Sta. Rita Avenue from vehicular traffic beginning of noon of the day of the parade with assembly and preparation of the event scheduled to begin at 1pm. The normally eastbound lanes of Dr. A. Santos Avenue from Soreena to Kabihasnan, eastbound lanes of NAIA Road from Quirino Avenue to Macapagal Boulevard, and southbound lanes of Macapagal Boulevard from NAIA Road to Bradco Avenue were also temporarily opened for counterflow in an effort to manage anticipated heavy traffic situation caused by the parade.

Heavy rain disrupted the parade program causing delays with the floats stuck in mud at the starting point of the parade. Besides the float of the eight featured films of the MMFF, the parade was supposed to be joined by the floats of the Parañaque local government and Metropolitan Manila Development Authority but their vehicles were not reportedly present in the starting area. The float, featuring the film Fantastica, was the first float to leave the assembly area at 1:25 pm albeit without members of its cast. The Fantastica cast boarded their film's float vehicle an hour later. The Girl in the Orange Dress float followed Fantastica's float with Jericho Rosales and Jessy Mendiola. By 3:30 pm, only three out of eight floats has managed to get out of the mud with One Great Love joining the vehicles of Fantastica and Girl in the Orange Dress. The float of Mary, Marry Me was the fourth and final vehicle able to join the parade.

The Jack Em Popoy cast opted to leave their float behind and boarded a truck instead. The cast of Otlum and Rainbow’s Sunset also did the same and boarded another vehicle while the cast of Aurora left their float but Anne Curtis is using her own van to head straight to Aseana where the parade ended.

At least two million were estimated to have witnessed the event live.

Awards

The Gabi ng Parangal of the 2018 Metro Manila Film Festival was held at The Theatre at Solaire in Parañaque on December 27, 2018. The awards night was hosted by Janno Gibbs, Mark Bautista, and Niña Dolino.

Christopher de Leon, Gina Alajar and Joanna Ampil are the new members of the MMFF jury for the 2018 edition of the film festival.

Major awards
Winners are listed first, highlighted in boldface, and indicated with a double dagger. Nominations are also listed if applicable.

Other awards
Male Star of the Night – Jericho Rosales
Female Star of the Night – Anne Curtis

Short Film category
Best Student Short Film – Kasilyas of Bulsu Cinephilia, Bulacan State University

 Multiple awards 

Box office gross
On January 8, 2019, a day after the official run of the 2018 MMFF concluded, the Metro Manila Development Authority announced that 2018 MMFF recorded the highest ever box office gross in the whole history of the film festival earning a total . The previous record was held by the 2015 Metro Manila Film Festival which earned  less than the 2018 edition. On January 10, 2019 it was announced that the top four grossing films (in no particular order) were: Aurora, Fantastica, Jack Em Popoy, and Mary, Marry Me''. By that time only Aurora has publicly released its earnings. According to Cinema Bravo, Aurora grossed

References

Metro Manila Film Festival
MMFF
MMFF
MMFF
MMFF
MMFF
December 2018 events in the Philippines
January 2019 events in the Philippines